Three ships of the Polish Navy have been named ORP Grom:

  was a  launched in 1936 and sunk near Narvik in 1940.
  was a Project 30bis destroyer received from the USSR in 1957 and decommissioned in 1973.
  is an  launched in 1995 and currently serving with the Polish Navy.

Polish Navy ship names